Zhang Tao (born 1963) is a Chinese chemist.

Zhang is a native of Shaanxi, born in 1963. Zhang earned a doctorate from Dalian Institute of Chemical Physics in 1989 and pursued postdoctoral research at the University of Birmingham before returning to DICP in 1990, where he was appointed to a full professorship in 1995. Zhang headed DICP as director from 2007 to 2017. In 2013, Zhang was elected to the Chinese Academy of Sciences.

References

Scientists from Shaanxi
Living people
Members of the Chinese Academy of Sciences
21st-century Chinese scientists
20th-century Chinese scientists
21st-century chemists
20th-century chemists
1963 births
Chinese chemists